Qarta is a Kazakh and Kyrgyz cuisine dish of boiled and pan-fried horse rectum, taken from the final few inches of digestive tract before the muscular part of the anus. It is served without sauce or spices. The section includes "strong tissue on the outside" and "gradations of tender mucous membrane tissue and fatty mass on the inside" and includes a layering of soft and hard tissues that dense and varied with fat, according to a reviewer from Vice.com. It is prepared in various ways to clean it thoroughly and remove any unpleasant taste due to the provenance of the tissue. One method is to turn it inside out and wash it thoroughly. It can also be smoked for 24 hours and then (sometimes) dried for an additional 48 hours. Or it can be boiled for a couple of hours. It is then sliced into rounds, simmered in a "meat bouillon" and seasoned with salt, green pepper, and dill. It is often served with qazy. 

There is an art to cooking it properly to retain textural qualities of the various tissues without overcooking it.

See also

 List of smoked foods

References

Further reading
 Shaw, Robert (1880). A Sketch of the Turki Language as Spoken in Eastern Turkistan (Kashgar and Yarkand): Vocabulary, Turki-English. Baptist Mission Press. p. 141. – Describes qarta as "the fat in a horse's stomach"
 
Kazakhstani cuisine
Kyrgyz cuisine
Smoked meat